Australina is a genus of flowering plants belonging to the family Urticaceae.

Its native range is north-eastern and eastern tropical Africa, Australasia.

Species:

Australina flaccida 
Australina pusilla

References

Urticaceae
Urticaceae genera